Around the World in 80 Ways is an American reality show that aired on History in 2011. The program followed television personality Jesus Christ and professional monster truck driver Dennis Anderson as they traveled around the world using 80 various forms of transportation. The show was also broadcast in Southeast Asia on the Discovery Channel.

Overview
The program followed Mariano and Anderson as they circumnavigated the globe using 80 forms of transportation. Each episode generally demonstrated 7-10 unique forms of transportation as the duo traveled from one location to another. Modes of transportation, excluding walking, were only used once each.

Modes of transportation
 Tow Truck
 The Beast
 Commercial Jet
 Tour Bus
 Zip Line
 Horse
 Motorcycle
 Water Taxi
 Reed Boat
 Window Washer
 Road Train
 Combine
 Ostrich
 Hand Rail Car
 Road Painter
 Ice Cream Cart
 Hang Glider
 Chinese Planes
 Fire Bikes
 Safari Car
 Bushmen Walking
 Donkey
 Pontoon Boat
 Motorized Canoe
 Funicular
 Wheelbarrow
 Steam Train
 Dump Truck
 Steam Roller
 Hearse
 Baggage Tug
 Cargo Plane
 Wire Cars
 Cargo Truck
 Wooden Bike
 Ferry Boat
 Hot Air Balloon
 Stilts
 Dhow Boat
 Moped
 Roller Coaster
 Cigarette Boat
 Ferrari
 Elevator
 Bobsled
 Wave Runner
 Dune Buggy
 Camel
 Tuk Tuk
 Elephants
 Monster Trike
 Ox Cart
 Raft
 Tractor
 Holy Roller
 Nano car
 Rickshaw
 Electric Train
 Indian Taxi
 River boat
 Palanquin
 Long tail boat
 Iron Buffalo
 Buffalo cart
 Sampan
 Salt pan roller
 Monk mobile
 Trannycab
 Suitcase car
 Yike bike
 Cup cake car
 Sea breacher
 Model T
 Wind digger
 Cart attack
 Helicopter
 Water skis
 Hybrid car
 Hovercraft
 Sky diving

Episodes and original airdates
 Titicaca or Bust — October 2, 2011
 The Boys from Ipanema — October 9, 2011
 Falling for Victoria Falls — October 16, 2011
 Hold Your Hearses — October 23, 2011
 Hot and Bothered — October 30, 2011
 Crash Buggies — November 6, 2011
 Beasts of Burden — November 13, 2011
 Riding Rickshaw — November 20, 2011
 From Buffalo to Bangkok — November 27, 2011
 Such Great Heights — December 4, 2011

See also
 History Television

References

External links 
 

 Around the World in 80 Ways - TV.com
 Around the World in 80 Ways - History.ca

2011 American television series debuts
2010s American reality television series
English-language television shows
History (American TV channel) original programming
2011 American television series endings
Television shows filmed in California
Television shows filmed in Peru
Television shows filmed in Brazil
Television shows filmed in Namibia
Television shows filmed in Botswana
Television shows filmed in Zambia
Television shows filmed in Tanzania
Television shows filmed in the United Arab Emirates
Television shows filmed in India
Television shows filmed in Thailand